Carlton Agudosi (born February 1, 1994) is an American football wide receiver for the Winnipeg Blue Bombers of the Canadian Football League (CFL). He was signed by the Arizona Cardinals as an undrafted free agent in 2017 and played college football at Rutgers.

Early years
Agudosi grew up in the Somerset section of Franklin Township, Somerset County, New Jersey and attended Franklin High School, from which he graduated in 2012.

College career
Agudosi played in 45 games in his career at Rutgers, recording 35 receptions for 513 yards and two touchdowns. His low production in college was largely due to the cycle of five offensive coordinators and five position coaches in his five years as a Scarlet Knight. He was named to the Academic All-Big Ten team as a sophomore in 2014.

Professional career

Arizona Cardinals

Agudosi signed the Arizona Cardinals as an undrafted free agent on May 2, 2017. He was waived on September 2, 2017 and was signed to the practice squad the next day. He was promoted to the active roster on November 22, 2017. He was waived on December 11, 2017 and was re-signed to the practice squad. He signed a reserve/future contract with the Cardinals on January 2, 2018.

On September 1, 2018, Agudosi was waived by the Cardinals.

Philadelphia Eagles
On January 7, 2019, Agudosi signed with the Philadelphia Eagles. He was waived during final roster cuts on August 30, 2019.

St. Louis BattleHawks
In October 2019, Agudosi was selected by the St. Louis BattleHawks during the open phase of the 2020 XFL Draft. He had his contract terminated when the league suspended operations on April 10, 2020.

Winnipeg Blue Bombers
Agudosi signed with the Winnipeg Blue Bombers of the CFL on April 30, 2021.

Personal life
Agudosi is of Nigerian descent through his father.

References

External links
Rutgers Scarlet Knights bio
Arizona Cardinals bio

1994 births
Living people
American football wide receivers
Franklin High School (New Jersey) alumni
People from Franklin Township, Somerset County, New Jersey
Players of American football from New Jersey
Sportspeople from Somerset County, New Jersey
American sportspeople of Nigerian descent
Rutgers Scarlet Knights football players
Arizona Cardinals players
Philadelphia Eagles players
St. Louis BattleHawks players
Winnipeg Blue Bombers players